James Arthur Boeheim Jr. (born November 17, 1944) is an American former college basketball coach. From 1976 until 2023, he was the head coach of the Syracuse Orange men's team of the Atlantic Coast Conference (ACC). Boeheim guided the Orange to ten Big East Conference regular season championships, five Big East tournament championships, and 34 NCAA tournament appearances, including five Final Four appearances and three appearances in the national title game. In those games, the Orangemen lost to Indiana in 1987, and to Kentucky in 1996, before defeating Kansas in 2003 with All-American Carmelo Anthony.

Boeheim has served as the President of the National Association of Basketball Coaches (NABC), chairman of the USA Basketball committees, and on various board of directors. He served as an assistant coach for the United States men's national basketball team at the Summer Olympics (2008, 2012, 2016) and the FIBA World Championships (1990, 2006, 2010). Boeheim was inducted into the Basketball Hall of Fame in September 2005.

Boeheim intended to retire in 2018 but departure of expected successor Mike Hopkins would keep him at Syracuse until his eventual retirement in 2023. During the 2021–2022 season Boeheim coached both of his sons, Jimmy and Buddy Boeheim. Boeheim would become the winningest active coach in Division 1 basketball on April 2, 2022, after the retirement of Mike Krzyzewski. As a result of the Syracuse athletics scandal in 2015, the NCAA vacated 101 of his wins.

After suffering from cancer in 2001, Boeheim founded with his wife the Jim and Juli Boeheim Foundation, which is devoted to child welfare, cancer treatment, and prevention.

Early life
Boeheim was born in 1944 in a German-American family to parents Janet and James Boeheim Sr. in Lyons, New York, a small town about 57 miles west of Syracuse. His family owned a funeral home, started by his great-grandfather in the mid-1800s. He graduated from Lyons Central High School, where he starred for coach Dick Blackwell's team.

Career

Playing

Boeheim enrolled in Syracuse University as a student in 1962, and graduated with a bachelor's degree in social science. During his freshman year, Boeheim was a walk-on with the freshman basketball team. By his senior year, he was the varsity team captain and a teammate of All-American Dave Bing, his freshman roommate. The pair led coach Fred Lewis's Orangemen to a 22–6 overall win–loss record that earned the team's second-ever NCAA tournament berth. While at Syracuse, he joined the Delta Upsilon fraternity. He played as a student at SU for two seasons and in 1970s served as the university’s last golf coach.

After graduating from Syracuse, Boeheim played professionally with the Scranton Miners of the Eastern Professional Basketball League, during which he won two championships and was a second-team all-star (SU Athletics). While working as a graduate assistant, he earned a graduate degree from Syracuse in 1973.

Coaching
In 1969, Boeheim decided to coach basketball and was hired as a graduate assistant at Syracuse under Roy Danforth. Soon thereafter he was promoted to a full-time assistant coach and was a member of the coaching staff that helped guide the Orangemen to the 1975 NCAA tournament, where Syracuse University made its first Final Four appearance.

In 1976, Danforth left to become the head basketball coach and athletic director at Tulane University. A coaching search then led to nought, and Boeheim was promoted by athletic director Les Dye in a 3–2 split hiring decision to become Syracuse's seventh head coach. He won the first game against Harvard by 20 points.

Apart from his brief stint in the pros, Boeheim has spent his entire adult life at Syracuse, as either a student-athlete (1962-1966), assistant coach (1969-1976) or head coach (1976-2023), a rarity in modern-day major collegiate athletics. In 2018, CBSSports.com writer Matt Norlander emphasized this in a piece where he speculated on potential successors for Boeheim, stating:Boeheim does not have a parallel in major college athletics. There has never been a Division I coach in men's basketball, women's basketball or football who has spent more than 40 years at their alma mater and never coached anywhere else. Boeheim's the only one. There is no coaching figure more synonymous and literally affiliated with only one school.

Norlander also noted that Boeheim entered the 2018–19 season with nearly as many wins on his official coaching record, and more when counting wins vacated by the NCAA, than all of his predecessors combined, and in his various roles at Syracuse had been involved in over half of all games in Syracuse's 114-year basketball history.

In 1986, Boeheim was offered the head coaching job at Ohio State but turned it down to stay at Syracuse.

During a Syracuse–Georgetown game in the early 1980s, Hoyas star Patrick Ewing was nearly struck by an orange, and at times had endured racial taunts from the SU student section. Boeheim borrowed a microphone and threatened to forfeit the game if fans continued to throw objects at Ewing.

In his first 41 years as head coach at Syracuse, Boeheim guided the Orange to postseason berths, either in the NCAA or NIT tournaments, in every year in which the Orange have been eligible. The only times Syracuse missed the postseason were in 1993 when NCAA sanctions barred them from postseason play despite a 20–9 record and in 2015 when Syracuse University self-imposed a one-year postseason ban related to the 2015 NCAA sanctions against the university's sports programs. In 2022, he had his first losing season, and missed the postseason. During his tenure, the Orange have appeared in three NCAA national championship games (1987, 1996, and 2003) and won the national title in 2003.

Boeheim has been named Big East coach of the year four times, and has been named as District II Coach of the Year by the National Association of Basketball Coaches ten times. In 2004, Boeheim received two additional awards. The first was during the spring when he was awarded the Clair Bee Award in recognition of his contributions to the sport of basketball. During the fall of the same year Boeheim was presented with Syracuse University's Arents Award, the university's highest alumni honor.

Boeheim's coaching style at Syracuse is unusual in that, whereas many highly successful coaches prefer the man-to-man defense, he demonstrates a preference for the match-up 2–3 zone. Having been fond of the zone, he implemented the defensive style early on among other, but went almost exclusively to the zone only around 1996.

In an exhibition game on November 7, 2005, against Division II school Saint Rose from Albany, New York, Boeheim was ejected for the first time in his career after arguing a call late in the first half in the Orange's 86–73 victory. He was also ejected from Cameron Indoor Stadium on February 22, 2014, against Duke after arguing a player control foul call.

Boeheim has also been a coach for USA national teams. In 2001, during his seventh year as a USA basketball coach, Boeheim helped lead the Young Men's Team to a gold medal at the World Championship in Japan. During the fall of that year, he was named USA Basketball 2001 National Coach of the Year. He was an assistant coach under Mike Krzyzewski for the US national team in the 1990 FIBA World Championship and 2006 FIBA World Championship, winning the bronze medal both times. He returned as an assistant coach under Mike Krzyzewski for the 2008 Summer Olympics in Beijing, China, and again at the 2012 Summer Olympics in London, England, where the United States won the gold medal both times.

Boeheim has served as the chairman of the USA Basketball 2009–12 Men's Junior National Committee, as well as the 2007–08 President of the National Association of Basketball Coaches (NABC), where he also served on the board of directors.

In the 2012–13 season, Boeheim led Syracuse to its first Final Four appearance since its 2003 NCAA National Championship. The Orange lost 61–56 to Michigan. In the 2013–14 season, he led the Orange to the NCAA Tournament and lost in the third-round game to the Dayton Flyers.

After Syracuse sat out the 2015 tournament via a self-imposed postseason ban, Boeheim again led Syracuse to a surprise Final Four berth in the 2015–16 season. This included a 15-point comeback versus the No. 1 seeded Virginia Cavaliers. The team lost to North Carolina 83–66.

The following season Syracuse started ranked 19th in the AP Poll, but failed to make the NCAA tournament. In the 2017–18 season Syracuse would return to the NCAA tournament despite going 8–10 in conference play. In the tournament Syracuse upset 4-seeded Michigan State before losing to Duke in the Sweet 16. The next year saw the Orange make back-to-back NCAA tournament appearances for the first time since the 2013–14 season. On January 14, 2019, Syracuse upset Duke in Cameron Indoor Stadium, marking the first time that the Blue Devils had lost to an unranked team at home. They would lose to Baylor in the opening round of the NCAA tournament. Syracuse started the 2019–20 season slow, losing 48–34 to Virginia, the lowest amount ever scored by a team in Boeheim's career. SU would win its final game of the season in the ACC tournament beating North Carolina 81–53 and defeating the Tar Heels for the first time since 2014. This would be the last game played due to COVID-19/ In the 2020–21 season SU would once again upset its way to the Sweet 16 beating 3-seeded West Virginia before losing to eventual Final Four participant Houston.

The Syracuse basketball program has been investigated for major NCAA violations on two occasions during Boeheim's tenure.

NCAA violations and punishment

On March 6, 2015, the NCAA suspended Boeheim for the first nine games of 2015–16 ACC conference play and took away 12 scholarships over a four-year period, as a result of a multi-year investigation into the university's athletic programs. The program was forced to vacate a total of 101 wins from the 2004–2005, 2005–2006, 2006–2007, 2010–2011, and 2011–2012 seasons, which included any game during those years where one or more players deemed to have been ineligible played. This constitutes the third-most wins ever permanently vacated by one program, behind the 113 wins vacated by Michigan and 123 wins by Louisville. Ten of the vacated wins were NCAA Tournament games. However, the NCAA confirmed that sanctions did not include the removal of any trophies or banners. Therefore, Syracuse displays banners for all of its NCAA appearances and conference titles from those years.

After two appeals, Boeheim's nine-game suspension was upheld, though he was permitted to begin the suspension prior to ACC conference play as dictated in the original penalty. Additionally, the permanent vacation and erasure of 101 wins was upheld. However, the number of scholarships lost by Syracuse was reduced to 8 over a four-year period, down from 12 over the same period.

Planned departure, reversal, and eventual retirement
Boeheim announced in 2015 that he would retire in March 2018. However, following the departure of his long-time assistant coach and expected successor Mike Hopkins in 2017, Boeheim's contract was extended by Syracuse beyond 2017 for an unknown period. In 2017, when his son Buddy committed to play at Syracuse starting in 2018, he extended his contract to beyond the 2017–18 season.

Boeheim was replaced following the 2022–23 season by former Syracuse point guard and assistant coach Adrian Autry. The New York Times reported that whether Boeheim had retired or been ousted was not immediately clear, but in a press conference a day later, Boeheim announced that he was thrilled to be retired.

Boeheim stayed at Syracuse, with a new job title of Special assistant to the athletic director. Boeheim's legacy was noted by sports media; Pete Thamel noted that Boeheim left a complicated legacy and his exit was far more fitting, Pat Forde called him an ultimate loyalist,  ESPNs McMenamin said his exit was an "end of a coaching generation", while Syracuse Post-Standards editorial board opined that "Boeheim put Syracuse on the map".

Awards and honors

NCAA
Boeheim's notable accomplishments during his career include:
 National championship (2003)
 National championship game appearances (3): (1987, 1996, 2003)
 Final Four appearances (5): (1987, 1996, 2003, 2013, 2016)
 Elite Eight appearances (7): (1987, 1989, 1996, 2003, 2012, 2013, 2016)
 Sweet Sixteen appearances (20): (1977, 1979, 1980, 1984, 1987, 1989, 1990, 1994, 1996, 1998, 2000, 2003, 2004, 2009, 2010, 2012, 2013, 2016, 2018, 2021)
 NCAA Tournament appearances (33): (1977, 1978, 1979, 1980, 1983, 1984, 1985, 1986, 1987, 1988, 1989, 1990, 1991, 1992, 1994, 1995, 1996, 1998, 1999, 2000, 2001, 2003, 2004, 2005, 2006, 2009, 2010, 2011, 2012, 2013, 2014, 2016, 2018, 2021)
 Big East regular season championships (10) : (1980, 1986, 1987, 1990, 1991, 1998*, 2000, 2003, 2010, 2012)
 Big East tournament championships (5): (1981, 1988, 1992, 2005, 2006)
 Big East Coach of the Year (4): (1984, 1991, 2000, 2010)
 NBA players produced: 49 in 47 seasons.

Halls of Fame
 Basketball Hall of Fame (2005) as a coach
 Named 2010 Naismith Coach of the Year (along with the same honor from the AP, Sporting News and many others) after leading Syracuse to an unexpected 30–5 record.
 USA Basketball's National Coach of the Year (2001)

Win milestones
 500: Boeheim reached the 500-win milestone in his 21st year as the coach. He was the 71st coach to reach the mark and second-fastest only after Jerry Tarkanian.
 750: Became only the 14th coach ever to reach 750 wins (2007)
 800: Joined Mike Krzyzewski and Jim Calhoun as the third active coach with 800 wins (2009)
 900: On December 17, 2012, Boeheim became the third coach in NCAA men's basketball history to reach 900 wins, along with Bob Knight and Mike Krzyzewski. 101 of those wins were vacated in 2015 after an NCAA investigation. On February 7, 2017, Boeheim officially reached this milestone again.
 1,000: On November 19, 2022 Boeheim won 1,000th win against Northeastern. He is the second coach after Mike Krzyzewski to pass that mark.

Other
 Leads all Big East coaches (past and present) in wins (366)
 Ranks sixth among active Division I coaches (min. 10 years) in winning percentage (.750)
 In 43 seasons at Syracuse, has compiled 34 20-win seasons, good for second most on the all-time list.
 Under Boeheim, the Orange have only missed the NCAA Tournament two years in a row twice.
 In recognition of Boeheim's numerous accomplishments as SU's head coach, the university named the Carrier Dome court "Jim Boeheim Court" on February 24, 2002.
 Coached the Orange to a 127–117 six-overtime win against the UConn Huskies, the longest game in the history of Big East Conference play.
 On March 19, 2021, Boeheim became the first men's coach to win an NCAA Tournament game in six different decades (1970s–2020s).

Coaching tree 
These former assistant coaches or players of Boeheim later became head coaches at the collegiate level or higher.
Adrian Autry: Syracuse (2023–present)
 Scott Hicks: Le Moyne (1992–1997); Albany (1997–2000); Loyola (MD) (2000–2004)
 Mike Hopkins: Washington (2017–present)
 Brendan Malone: Rhode Island (1984–1986); Toronto Raptors (1995–1996); Cleveland Cavaliers (2005, interim)
 Wayne Morgan: Long Beach State (1996–2002); Iowa State (2003–2006)
 Rob Murphy: Eastern Michigan (2011–2021)
 Tim O'Toole: Fairfield (1998–2006)
 Louis Orr: Siena (2000–2001); Seton Hall (2001–2006); Bowling Green (2007–2014)
 Rick Pitino: Boston University (1978–1983); Providence (1985–1987); New York Knicks (1987–1989); Kentucky (1989–1997); Boston Celtics (1997–2001); Louisville (2001–2017); Iona (2020–present)
 Stephen Thompson: Cal State Los Angeles (2005–2014)
 Tim Welsh: Iona (1995–1998); Providence (1998–2008)
 Troy Weaver: Detroit Pistons General Manager (2020–Present)
Additionally, all three assistants on Boeheim's 2022–23 coaching staff played at Syracuse under Boeheim: Adrian Autry, Gerry McNamara, and Allen Griffin.

Personal life and charity
Boeheim appeared in the movie Blue Chips, with Nick Nolte and Shaquille O'Neal, playing himself. Boeheim also appeared in the Spike Lee movie He Got Game, again playing himself. Boeheim has appeared in numerous commercials throughout Central New York and also had a spot in a nationwide Nike Jordan ad featuring former Syracuse great Carmelo Anthony. 

Boeheim had prostate cancer in 2001 and subsequently became a major fundraiser for Coaches vs. Cancer, a non-profit collaboration between the NABC and the American Cancer Society, through which he has helped raise more than US$4.5 million for ACS's Central New York chapter since 2000. In 2009, Boeheim and his wife, Juli, founded the Jim and Juli Boeheim Foundation to expand their charitable mission to organizations around Central New York concerned with child welfare, as well as cancer treatment and prevention.

Boeheim married his wife Juli in 1997, and they have three children together: Jimmy and a set of twins, son Buddy and daughter Jamie. Boeheim also has a daughter with former wife Elaine. His son Jimmy played forward for Cornell from 2017 to 2020, but did not get to play what would have been his senior season at Cornell because the Ivy League canceled its 2020–21 season due to COVID-19. He entered the NCAA transfer portal in the fall of 2020, transferred to Syracuse, and played the 2021-22 season for Syracuse. Jamie played forward for the University of Rochester and Buddy played guard for his father at Syracuse.

Around 11:22 p.m. on February 20, 2019, Boeheim was driving his car on Interstate 690 in Syracuse when he struck and killed a 51-year-old man who was standing near the side of the road. The accident was reportedly a result of a disabled car being in the middle of the road in bad weather. When Boeheim maneuvered around the other car, he struck the man, who had been a passenger in the disabled car. Field, speed, and sobriety tests were administered by police. Boeheim was speeding, but Onondaga County District Attorney William Fitzpatrick determined the collision would have been fatal even if Boeheim was going the speed limit at the time. It was additionally found that the disabled vehicle did not have lights on and had non-operational rear marker lights, and that the passengers of the disabled car, including the man who was struck and killed, were wearing dark clothing. Boeheim was not charged relating to the incident.

Boeheim has received criticism for his aggressive nature toward the press and often got into spats with beat writers. In March 2021, he was criticised for mocking a reporter's height during a postgame press conference following a win against Clemson.

Head coaching record 

† - From 1975 to 1982, the Eastern College Athletic Conference (ECAC) organized annual regional end-of-season men's basketball tournaments for independent Division I ECAC member colleges and universities in the Northeastern United States. The winner of each regional tournament was declared the ECAC regional champion for the season and received an automatic bid in the NCAA Division I men's basketball tournament.

 The NCAA vacated 15 wins from the 2004–05 season, 23 wins from the 2005–06 season, 22 wins from the 2006–07 season, 7 wins from the 2010–11 season, and 34 wins from the 2011–12 season as a result of the Syracuse athletics scandal.

 Boeheim was suspended for nine games during the 2015–16 season, during which Syracuse went 4–5 overall, and 0–3 in conference. So while the team's record was 23–14 overall, 9–9 in conference, Boeheim is credited with 19–9 overall, 9–6 in conference.

 Boeheim's official NCAA record excludes the aforementioned 101 vacated wins as well as the games during his nine-game suspension in 2015–2016, however Syracuse claims all of its NCAA appearances and conference titles from those years.

See also
 List of college men's basketball coaches with 600 wins
 List of NCAA Division I Men's Final Four appearances by coach
 Boeheim's Army

Footnotes

References

Further reading

External links

 
 
 OrangeHoops.org with a Boeheims' profile

1944 births
Living people
American men's basketball coaches
American men's basketball players
Basketball coaches from New York (state)
Basketball players from New York (state)
College men's basketball head coaches in the United States
People from Lyons, New York
Point guards
Naismith Memorial Basketball Hall of Fame inductees
National Collegiate Basketball Hall of Fame inductees
Shooting guards
Syracuse Orange men's basketball coaches
Syracuse Orange men's basketball players
American people of German descent